Neumi (느미) also known as The Deaf Worker is a 1980 South Korean film directed by Kim Ki-young.

Synopsis
A melodrama about a mute woman who works at a brick factory.

Cast
Chang Mi-hee
Hah Myung-joong
Lee Hwa-si
Kim Chung-chul
Baek Il-seob
Kwon Mi-Hye
Park Am
Lee Young-ho
Joo Sun-tae
Moon Mi-bong

References

Bibliography

External links

1980 films
1980s Korean-language films
South Korean drama films
Films directed by Kim Ki-young